1-Methylcyclopropene (1-MCP) is a cyclopropene derivative used as a synthetic plant growth regulator.  It is structurally related to the natural plant hormone ethylene and it is used commercially to slow down the ripening of fruit and to help maintain the freshness of cut flowers.

Synthesis
1-Methylcyclopropene is synthesized by the reaction of methallyl chloride and phenyllithium, which functions as a base:

The phenyllithium should be free of lithium halides.  The corresponding reaction of allyl chloride and phenyllithium main affords cyclopropylbenzene.

Isomers
Methylcyclopropene can refer to either of two isomers, 1-methylcyclopropene covered in this article, or 3-methylcyclopropene which is not covered in this article.  2-methylcyclopropene would be an incorrect name for 1-methylcyclopropene.  Also note: methylcyclopropane is yet a different chemical compound, which is a cycloalkane with the formula C4H8.

Mechanism of action

Ethylene is a gas acting at trace levels (typically between a few tenths and a few thousands ppm in the gas atmosphere) throughout the life of a plant by stimulating or regulating various processes such as the ripening of climacteric fruit, the opening of flowers (dehiscence process), and the shedding of leaves (abscission process).  The mechanism of action of 1-MCP involves its tightly binding to the ethylene receptor in plants, thereby blocking the effects of ethylene (competitive inhibitor).

Commercial use

1-MCP is used commercially to maintain the freshness of ornamental plants and flowers and preventing the ripening of fruits.  It is used in enclosed sites, such as coolers, truck trailers, greenhouses, storage facilities, and shipping containers.

For cut flowers, potted flowers, and bedding, nursery and foliage plants, 1-MCP prevents or delays wilting, leaf yellowing, opening, and death.

Under the brand name SmartFresh, 1-MCP is used in the agriculture industry by growers, packers, and shippers to prevent or delay the natural ripening process.  The use of 1-MCP in agricultural products including apples, kiwifruit, tomatoes, bananas, plums, persimmons, avocados, and melons has been approved and accepted for use in more than 34 countries including the European Union and the United States.  Although benefiting from fresher produce and lower cost, the consumer however may be purchasing fruit that is older than expected.

1-MCP is also being developed as a crop protection technique.  By spraying 1-MCP on growing field crops during times of stress, the crops may be protected from moderate heat and drought conditions.

See also
 Ethylene as a plant hormone
 Methylenecyclopropane, an isomer

References

Cyclopropenes
Plant growth regulators